Dumbarton East railway station serves the town of Dumbarton in the West Dunbartonshire region of Scotland.

History 
Unlike the majority of the North Clyde line stations, this is an island platform, betraying its Lanarkshire and Dunbartonshire Railway origins. At the time of electrification by British Railways in 1961, the North British Railway's formation from Bowling was abandoned (except a short spur to serve Bowling Oil Terminal), with a short link line between the North British and Caledonian formations being constructed. The North British formation is regained between Dumbarton East and  station at the site of the junction between the two railways.

Services

2008 
Four trains per hour daily go eastbound to Glasgow Queen Street and beyond and a half-hourly service westbound to both  and  respectively.

2016 
There are now six departures per hour from here in each direction (Mon-Sat). Westbound trains still run to Balloch and Helensburgh Central, but 2tph terminate at Dumbarton Central. Eastbound trains run to  via Clydebank,  via  and Edinburgh Waverley (express via Clydebank).

References

Notes

Sources 
 

 
 
 
 RAILSCOT on the Lanarkshire and Dunbartonshire Railway

External links
Video footage of Dumbarton East Railway Station

Dumbarton
Railway stations in West Dunbartonshire
Former Caledonian Railway stations
Railway stations in Great Britain opened in 1896
Railway stations served by ScotRail
SPT railway stations